Louis Kwame Sakyiamah, also known as Lexis Bill is a Ghanaian radio and TV presenter and an entrepreneur.

Early life and education 
Lexis Bill was born to Mr Dickson Nuamah and Mrs Wilhemina Animwaah and hails from Abompe in the Eastern Region, Ghana. He is the first born among 3 siblings. After completing his basic education at PRESEC-Legon, he went to the Presbyterian Boys' Senior High School for his secondary education and received a Bachelor of Arts in Social Science from Kwame Nkrumah University of Science and Technology (KNUST). Lexis then pursued a Masters in Business Administration (MBA) in Ghana Institute of Management and Public Administration (GIMPA).

Career life
Lexis begun his media career in Kumasi with Focus FM and then to Kapital Radio and Radio Xtacy (formerly Kessewaa Radio). In 2010, he moved to Multimedia and commenced with Hitz FM and before progressing to Joy FM. His influencers include Tommy Annan Forson, Bola Ray, Kwami Sefa Kayi and Komla Dumor. In 2017, he was chosen as the TV host for Men's World. Lexis owns a corporate fitness company (X fitness), a gym, a media agency for corporate public relations and advertising, besides a production house and an event-planning company. He regularly holds a fitness programme themed, Walk With Lexis.

Personal life 
Sakyiamah married his long-time girlfriend Esther Esimi Siale in a private ceremony in Accra on 20 November 2020.

Awards and nominations

References 

Living people
Ghanaian radio presenters
Kwame Nkrumah University of Science and Technology alumni
Presbyterian Boys' Senior High School alumni
Year of birth missing (living people)